Solun may refer to:

Thessaloniki, a Greek city known as Solun in several languages
Solun, Horqin Right Front Banner, a town in Inner Mongolia, China
Solun, Olovo, a village in Bosnia and Herzegovina
Solun or Solon people, a subgroup of the Evenki people of Northeastern China
Solun Glacier, Antarctica
Solun-Voden dialect, a South Slavic dialect

See also
 Solon (disambiguation)
 Soluna (disambiguation)